Lemuel Smith may refer to:
Lemuel Smith (born 1941), serial killer
Lemuel F. Smith (1890–1956), Virginia lawyer and judge
Lemuel Smith (cricketer) (1880–1927), English cricketer